Harald Kleinhofer (21 May 1974 – 28 January 2016) was an Austrian luger who competed from 1998 to 2005. A natural track luger, he won the bronze medal in the men's doubles event at the 2003 FIL World Luge Natural Track Championships in Železniki, Slovenia.

References

FIL-Luge profile
Natural track World Championships results: 1979-2007

External links
 

1974 births
2016 deaths
Austrian male lugers